Cullenia rosayroana is a species of flowering plant in the family Malvaceae.
It is endemic to Sri Lanka.

References

rosayroana
Endemic flora of Sri Lanka
Conservation dependent plants
Near threatened flora of Asia
Taxonomy articles created by Polbot